Autobahn Country Club is an auto racing road course located in Joliet, Illinois, operated as a country club, while also hosting many outside events. Autobahn was the first purpose-built motorsports country club in the United States, and has inspired several others. The club has a sanctioning body called Autobahn Member Racing, which hosts series for Spec Miatas, GT cars, karts, Radical Sportscars, a discipline called Chase Racing similar to bracket racing, open wheel cars, as well as competitions for rallycross and autocross. The club requires a $45,000 membership fee to have unlimited access to the tracks six days a week in season, and the club house, which contains a bar and banquet hall.  Members can purchase land to build garages and personal condos. Notable members include legendary racers Bobby Rahal, Graham Rahal, David Heinemeier Hansson, Cooper MacNeil, Jay Howard, Peter Dempsey, and Tom Bagley. Many members use the club to drive their exotic and classic cars.

The facility is available for rent by private groups. It hosts events for various organizations including the SCCA, NASA, Gridlife, Midwestern Council, PCA, One Lap of America, and various marque and track day clubs. Many manufacturers also rent the facility for marketing events.

The tracks and facilities
The Autobahn full track is 3.56 miles in distance. The full track can be split into two smaller tracks. Autobahn Country Club also offers a skidpad for the teen driving academy and drifting. The kart track is also open to the public on weekdays. The club has a free test fleet of performance and exotic cars for members to drive on track at reduced speeds. The club has a racing school with instructors including Super Vee champion and 1978 Indycar Rookie of the Year Tom Bagley and 1990 SCCA Formula Ford champion Tony Kester. There is also a public defensive driving school, that uses specially prepared BMW cars to teach safe driving skills.

Businesses in paddock
Along with private garages and condos, various performance shops and race headquarters are located on the Autobahn campus. Some of these include Eurosport Racing, Team Stradale, Havoc Motorsport, Turn 3 Motorsport, and many other businesses available for onsite service.

References

External links
Official Website
Superbike School
Trackpedia's circuit information and track guide on Autobahn CC

1tail Resource Database: Autobahn Country Club

Sports venues in Joliet, Illinois
Motorsport venues in Illinois
Road courses in the United States